Pierre Walters (born March 25, 1986) is a former American football defensive end and active mixed martial artist. Previously, he was an American football linebacker for the Kansas City Chiefs of the National Football League. He was signed by the Chiefs as an undrafted free agent in 2009. In 2012, he played for the Spokane Shock and Chicago Rush of the Arena Football League. He played college football at Eastern Illinois.

Pierre is currently the Total Fight Challenge light heavyweight (205 lbs) champion, having won the belt with a three-round unanimous decision victory over Ramiro Marquez on February 12, 2016.

External links
 Eastern Illinois Panthers bio
 Kansas City Chiefs bio
 
 
 

1986 births
Living people
Players of American football from Illinois
American football defensive ends
American football linebackers
Eastern Illinois Panthers football players
Arena Football League
Kansas City Chiefs players
People from Forest Park, Illinois
Spokane Shock players